Camassia leichtlinii, the great camas or large camas, is a species of flowering plant in the family Asparagaceae. This herbaceous perennial is native to western North America in British Columbia, Canada and California, Nevada, Oregon and Washington, USA.

Description
Great camas is a perennial herbaceous plant that grows from a bulb. Leaves are long and narrow, stemming from the basal rosette. The inflorescence is a spike-like cluster on a leafless stem that is held above the leaves. It can be mistaken for the more common Camassia quamash, which has an overlapping range.

Ecology
It needs consistent moisture in the spring, but will not be harmed by seasonal drought after the seed pods mature and the leaves dry out. Camas stands can benefit from seasonal fires as well, as they aid in regeneration and reduce competition from brush and weeds.

Uses
The bulbs are edible, but must be baked at length. Traditionally, they were cooked in fire pits for at least three hours, and ideally for between one and three days. Caution should be taken not to confuse this species with the deadly meadow death-camas.

References

Agavoideae
Root vegetables
Taxa named by John Gilbert Baker
Taxa named by Sereno Watson